Garampani is a town in Golaghat district, Assam, India.

Geography
It is located at an elevation of 117 m above MSL.

Location
National Highway 39 passes through Garampani. It is 25 km south of Golaghat.

Places of interest
 Garampani Wildlife Sanctuary
 Kaziranga National Park

References

External links
 Satellite map of Garampani
 About Garampani

Cities and towns in Golaghat district